William F. Tisch (November 17, 1838 – September 8, 1877) was an American miller and politician.

Tisch was born in Eutin, Germany. He emigrated to the United States in 1851, Tisch lived in Williamsburg, New York City, New York and Paterson, New Jersey. Tisch eventually settled in the town of Mishicot, Manitowoc County, Wisconsin in 1854. Tisch was a miller. He served as chairman of the town of Mishicot in 1872 and was a Democrat. Tisch served in the Wisconsin Assembly in 1876. Tisch committed suicide with a firearm in Mishicot.

Notes

External links

1838 births
1877 deaths
German emigrants to the United States
People from Eutin
People from Mishicot, Wisconsin
Millers
Mayors of places in Wisconsin
Democratic Party members of the Wisconsin State Assembly
American politicians who committed suicide
Suicides by firearm in Wisconsin
19th-century American politicians